The Tabor Bluejays are the athletic teams that represent  Tabor College, located in Hillsboro, Kansas, in intercollegiate sports as a member of the National Association of Intercollegiate Athletics (NAIA), primarily competing in the Kansas Collegiate Athletic Conference (KCAC) since the 1968–69 academic year.

Varsity teams
Tabor competes in 20 intercollegiate varsity sports: Men's sports include baseball, basketball, cross country, football, golf, soccer, tennis and track & field (indoor and outdoor); while women's sports include basketball, cross country, golf, soccer, softball, tennis, track & field (indoor and outdoor) and volleyball; and co-ed sports include cheerleading.

Football

The current head football coach at Tabor is Mike Gardner.  Coach Gardner returned to take over the 2010 season after serving as head coach for the 2004 and 2005 seasons, where the teams posted a combined record of 20 wins and 3 losses with two consecutive conference championships and two post-season appearances.  In 2009, Tabor College built Joel Wiens Stadium, a new football complex that is shared with Hillsboro High School.

In 2012, Tabor redshirt Junior Brandon Brown was found murdered in nearby McPherson, Kansas.  Two former members of the McPherson Bulldogs football team were charged.  As of October 5, 2012, the investigation is ongoing.

Women's basketball
Tabor college women's basketball team was nationally ranked in 2007.

References

External links